Fabian Dawkins (born 7 February 1981 in Duncans, Trelawny Parish) is a Jamaican former footballer.

Club career
Dawkins grew up in August Town, St. Andrew and attended Jamaica College. Nicknamed 'Renaldo', the attacking midfielder started his career at Village United F.C. in the Jamaica National Premier League, where he became their leading goalscorer for three seasons running. He then moved abroad with former Village teammate Shane Crawford to play two seasons for the Atlanta Silverbacks. He later joined the Montreal Impact in the USL First Division, where he was later traded in January 2007 with Jason McLaughlin for forward Mauricio Salles and Daniel Antoniuk. In 2007, he was loaned to the Impact's farm team the Trois-Rivières Attak of the Canadian Soccer League. He made his debut for the club on 3 June 2007 in a match against Portuguese Supra, which resulted in the club's first home victory by a score 4–2. In between the USL 1st division season, he went back to Jamaica to form a prolific strike partnerships with Newton Sterling and Teafore Bennett at Village United.

International career
He appeared in the 2001 FIFA World Youth Championship in Argentina, where he captained the squad and scored their only goal of the tournament. He made his debut for the "Reggae Boyz" in 2001 against Grenada and has collected a total of 17 caps (scoring one goal) until October 2006.

References

External links
 Profile at Golocaljamaica
 Profile at Montreal Impact
 

1981 births
Living people
Atlanta Silverbacks players
Expatriate soccer players in Canada
Expatriate soccer players in the United States
Association football midfielders
Association football forwards
Canadian Soccer League (1998–present) players
Jamaica international footballers
Jamaican expatriate footballers
Jamaican expatriate sportspeople in Canada
Jamaican expatriate sportspeople in the United States
Jamaican footballers
Montreal Impact (1992–2011) players
People from Trelawny Parish
Richmond Kickers players
Trois-Rivières Attak players
USL First Division players
USL Second Division players
Village United F.C. players
August Town F.C. players
National Premier League players